Morningstar, Inc. is an American financial services firm headquartered in Chicago, Illinois and was founded by Joe Mansueto in 1984. It provides an array of investment research and investment management services.

With operations in 29 countries, Morningstar's research and recommendations are considered by financial journalists as influential in the asset management industry, and a positive or negative recommendation from Morningstar analysts can drive money into or away from any given fund.

The firm also provides software and data platforms for investment professionals, including "Morningstar Research Portal", "Morningstar Direct" and "Morningstar Advisor Workstation".

History
Founder Joe Mansueto initially had the idea for Morningstar in 1982 while reviewing mutual fund annual reports he had requested from several prominent fund managers. However, it was only after a year working as a stock analyst for Harris Associates, seeing the fund industry and potential competitors up close, that he was convinced that the opportunity was there. Morningstar was subsequently founded in 1984 from his one-bedroom Chicago apartment with an initial investment of US$80,000. The name Morningstar is taken from the last sentence in Walden, a book by Henry David Thoreau; "the sun is but a morning star".

In July 1999, Morningstar accepted an investment of US$91 million from SoftBank in return for a 20 percent stake in the company.  The two companies had formed a joint venture in Japan the previous year.

Morningstar's initial public offering occurred on May 3, 2005, with 7,612,500 shares at $18.50 each. The manner in which Morningstar went public is notable. They elected to follow Google's footsteps and use the OpenIPO method rather than the traditional method. This allowed individual investors to bid on the price of the stock, and allowed all investors equal access.

In 2006, Morningstar acquired Ibbotson Associates, Inc., an investment research firm. In 2007, Morningstar acquired the mutual fund data business of S&P Global.

In 2010, Morningstar acquired credit rating agency Realpoint and begins offering structured credit ratings and research to institutional investors. In the same year, Morningstar acquired Old Broad Street Research Ltd. (OBSR), a UK-based provider of fund research, ratings and investment advisory services, for $18.3 million. After the acquisition, renamed as Morningstar OBSR.

In 2014, Morningstar acquired ByAllAccounts, Inc., a provider of innovative data aggregation technology for financial applications.

In 2016, Morningstar acquires remaining ownership of PitchBook Data for approximately $225 million. In September 2016, Morningstar announced that it had appointed Kunal Kapoor as chief executive officer, effective January 2017, with Mansueto becoming executive chairman at the same time.

In 2019, Morningstar to acquire the world's fourth largest credit rating agency DBRS for $669 million. After the acquisition, DBRS merged with Morningstar’s credit rating business。

In 2020, Morningstar entered into an agreement to acquire Sustainalytics, a research and ratings firm specializing in environmental, social and governance (ESG) insights. That same year, Morningstar agreed to acquire PlanPlus Global, a Canada-based financial planning and risk assessment software company.

In 2021, Morningstar announced it would acquire the UK and international (including Jersey, Hong Kong and Dubai) operations of the Australian wealth management platform Praemium (ASX: PPS) for £35 million.

In 2022, Morningstar announced that it will acquire the S&P Global-owned Leveraged Commentary & Data (LCD), a company specializing in leveraged loan market data, for $600 million up to $650 million.

Products and services
Morningstar offers a wide array of products and services to both retail and institutional investors.

Morningstar Investment Management
Through its investment management subsidiary, Morningstar currently has over US$265 billion in assets under advisement and management.

Morningstar Direct
Morningstar Direct is a software platform that provides data and analytics to help professional investment managers craft new products and portfolios.

Morningstar Office Cloud
Morningstar offers a single end-to-end cloud-based platform for investment advisors, known as Morningstar Office Cloud. The software allows financial advisors to manage their practice, gain access to data and research, analyze investments, and connect with investors.

Morningstar Premium
The firm offers retail and individual investors with access to news, research, and stock, bond, and mutual fund analysis through its 'Morningstar Premium' subscription product.

Credit Ratings (NRSRO)
In 2010, Morningstar acquired Realpoint, LLC, a former division of private-equity giant Capmark Finance and a nationally recognized statistical rating organization (NRSRO). The firm was rebranded as Morningstar Credit Ratings and competes with S&P, Moody's Investors Service, Fitch Ratings and similar Wall Street firms to provide research and ratings of structured debt products, including mortgage-backed securities and asset-backed securities. Today, Morningstar Credit Ratings issues credit ratings on both structured financial products (CMBS, RMBS, CLOs) and corporate/financial institutions.

On May 29, 2019, Morningstar publicly announced its intention to significantly expand the breadth and scope of its ratings business through a $669 million acquisition of DBRS.

Morningstar Research Portal
In 2022, Morningstar launched its newest research platform aimed at helping financial advisors utilize Morningstar's investment research and other tools to identify and select investments, monitor investment performance, and inform how they communicate with clients.

Influence and criticisms
Morningstar is considered powerful in the investment management industry, and the firm's ratings and recommendations often influence a fund's assets under management. The firm's "star" ratings are often used by fund managers in marketing materials, and positive star ratings bring a credibility to a fund's strategy. Morningstar's analysts and data are frequently quoted in outlets such as the New York Times, Wall Street Journal, and Financial Times.

In October 2017, the Wall Street Journal published a front-page feature story criticizing Morningstar's influence and questioned the predictive power of the firm's rating system. In response, Morningstar provided a quantitative analysis showing that higher-rated funds outperform lower-rated funds, but cautioned against using the ratings as a definitive marker of future performance.

Corporate identity
Morningstar's current logo was designed by the famed graphic designer Paul Rand. The design features the "o" in Morningstar appearing as a rising sun, which is a nod to a Henry David Thoreau quote that inspired the company's name. Mansueto considers the logo "one of our most valuable assets".

Major offices
The firm is headquartered in Chicago, Illinois, with major regional offices in New York City, London, Paris, Sydney, Hong Kong, Shenzhen and other cities around the world.

See also
American Association of Individual Investors
Bloomberg L.P.
Nationally recognized statistical rating organization
Reuters
Value Line

References

External links

Investor Relations
Understanding the Star Rating and Fund Analyst Picks (from www.morningstar.com)

1984 establishments in Illinois
2005 initial public offerings
American companies established in 1984
Companies based in Chicago
Companies listed on the Nasdaq
Credit rating agencies
Financial data vendors
Financial services companies established in 1984
Research and analysis firms of the United States